Hall (locally known as Hall Siding) is a small community in the Selkirk Mountains in the West Kootenay region of the Regional District of Central Kootenay in British Columbia, Canada. Hall is south of Nelson and north of Ymir. Hall Creek flows into the Salmo River in the community. British Columbia Highway 6 runs through the Hall. Hall is named for two brothers (Osner and Winslow Hall) from Colville, Washington, who came to Quartz Creek in 1886 and lead an expedition that discovered gold, copper and silver deposits on Toad Mountain. They staked the Silver King mine, which in turn gave rise to the city of Nelson.

The Hall post office was originally founded in 1898, then it closed in 1904, only to reopen briefly from 1914 to 1925.

The Nelson and Fort Sheppard Railway built a station at Hall.

Today only one of the original streets still exists.

References

Selkirk Mountains
Populated places in the Regional District of Central Kootenay